Eragrostis amabilis is a bunchgrass, in the subfamily Chloridoideae of Poaceae, native to Africa and southern Asia. Synonymy includes: Eragrostis tenella Benth., Eragrostis elegans Nees, and Eragrostis interrupta Lam. Döll.

Uses
Eragrostis amabilis is grown as a drought tolerant ornamental grass in gardens.

References

External links

 Flora brasilensis: Eragrostis interrupta

Bunchgrasses of Africa
Flora of temperate Asia
Flora of tropical Asia
Bunchgrasses of Asia
Garden plants of Asia
Garden plants of Africa
amabilis